Eduard Adolf Strasburger (1 February 1844 – 18 May 1912) was a Polish-German professor and one of the most famous botanists of the 19th century. He discovered mitosis in plants.

Life
Eduard Strasburger was born in Warsaw, Congress Poland, the son of Krystyna Anna (von Schütz) and Edward Bogumił Strasburger (1803–1874). In 1870, he married Aleksandra Julia Wertheim (1847–1902), they had two children: Anna (1870–1942) and Julius (1871–1934).

Strasburger studied biological sciences in Paris, Bonn and Jena, receiving a PhD in 1866 after working with Nathanael Pringsheim.  In 1868 he taught at the University of Warsaw. In 1869 he was appointed professor of botany at the University of Jena.  From 1881 he was head of the Botanisches Institut at the University of Bonn.

Strasburger died in Bonn, Germany.

Achievements 
Strasburge was a founder of the famous Lehrbuch der Botanik für Hochschulen (Textbook of Botany), which first appeared in 1894. He was the first to provide an accurate description of the embryonic sac in gymnosperms (such as conifers) and angiosperms (flowering plants), along with demonstrating double-fertilization in angiosperms. He came up with one of the modern laws of plant cytology: "New cell nuclei can only arise from the division of other nuclei." and originated the terms cytoplasm and nucleoplasm.

Together with Walther Flemming and Edouard van Beneden, he elucidated chromosome distribution during cell division. His work on the upward movement of tree sap proved that the process was physical and not physiological.

Awards

He was awarded the Linnean Medal in 1905, as well as the Linnean Society of London's even more prestigious Darwin-Wallace Medal in 1908, awarded only once every 50 years.

Family 
Strasburger was married to the pianist Alexandra Julie ("Alexandrine") Wertheim (1847–1902, daughter of the banker and councillor Julius Wertheim 1817–1901 from Warsaw, half sister of Carl Tausig) and aunt of the pianist Juliusz Wertheim
(1880−1928); they had three children (the third died early). His son was the internist Julius Strasburger, a grandson was the ancient historian Hermann Strasburger.

Works 

On Cell Formation and Cell Division, 1876 – a book in which he set forth the basic principles of mitosis.
Ueber das Verhalten des Pollens und die Befruchtungsvorgänge bei den Gymnospermen: Schwärmsporen, Gameten, pflanzliche Spermatozoiden und das Wesen der Befruchtung. Gustav Fischer Verlag, Jena, 1892.
Lehrbuch der Botanik für Hochschulen, 1st ed., 1894; 4th ed., 1900, digital edition by ULB Düsseldorf; 5th ed., 1902, by ULB Düsseldorf; 8th ed., 1906, by ULB Düsseldorf; 16th ed., 1923, available at BHL; 33rd ed., 1991; 36th ed. 2008. Translated to English, Estonian, Italian, Japanese, Polish, Russian, Serbo-Croatian, and Spanish. A complete list of editions and translations up to 1994 is given in Finke et al. (1994)
 A Textbook of botany, 1st ed., 1898, English translation of the 2nd German ed. (1895), available at BHL. Macmillan, London. 
Das kleine botanische Practicum für Anfänger : Anleitung zum Selbststudium der mikroskopischen Botanik und Einführung in die mikroskopische Technik, 4th ed., 1902, digital edition by ULB Düsseldorf.

See also
 List of Poles

Notes

References
"Strasburger, Eduard Adolf"  Encyclopædia Britannica (1979 ed)
"Science is in a Constant Flow": Live and Work of Eduard Strasburger (1844–1912)
Family Tree maintained by great-great-grandniece Elonka Dunin

 Finke,  H.M., A. Besinsky, D. von Denffer, F. Ehrendorfer, K. Mägdefrau, P. Sitte, H. Ziegler, W.D. von Lucius (1994): 100 Jahre Strasburgers Lehrbuch der Botanik für Hochschulen, 1894–1994. Gustav Fischer, Stuttgart/ Jena / New York. 168 Seiten.
 Alt, W., K. P. Sauer: Biologie an der Universität Bonn. Eine 200-jährige Ideengeschichte. In: Bonner Schriften zur Universitäts- und Wissenschaftsgeschichte. Band 8. V&R unipress, 2016 (hdl.handle.net).

External links
 
 

1844 births
1912 deaths
Scientists from Warsaw
19th-century German botanists
19th-century Polish botanists
Schoolteachers from Warsaw
University of Bonn alumni
Academic staff of the University of Bonn
Foreign associates of the National Academy of Sciences
Foreign Members of the Royal Society
Corresponding members of the Saint Petersburg Academy of Sciences
Members of the Royal Society of Sciences in Uppsala